Drug-induced urticaria occurs by immunologic and nonimmunologic mechanisms, urticaria most commonly caused by aspirin and NSAIDs.

See also 
 List of cutaneous conditions
 Localized heat contact urticaria
 Skin lesion

References 

Drug eruptions
Urticaria and angioedema
Drug-induced diseases